Antony Domingo Silva Cano (born 27 February 1984), commonly known as Antony Silva or mistakenly as Anthony Silva, is a Paraguayan footballer who plays as goalkeeper for Liga MX club Puebla and the Paraguay national team. Silva also holds Italian citizenship.

Career
Silva began his career in the youth ranks of Club Cerro Corá. In 2000, he made his professional debut with the club.

Libertad
Silva was signed by Club Libertad in 2003. During the 2004 Copa Libertadores, Silva helped Libertad to a famous 1–0 win over Argentine club River Plate in a match played at Defensores del Chaco on April 7.
Argentina's Clarín raved about Silva's performance, stating: "The goalkeeper Anthony Silva was the big star: he closed off all roads to the Argentines."

Loan to General Caballero ZC
After being primarily the reserve goalkeeper for Libertad, Silva joined General Caballero on loan during the 2005 season. Silva's rights were purchased by Italian club Genoa but never officially joined the Italian side.

Loan to 2 de Mayo
In 2006 Silva signed on loan with Club 2 de Mayo and established himself as the teams' main goalkeeper. During Silva's loan to 2 de Mayo, he was coached by Saturnino Arua and was teammates with Salustiano Candia. On 15 March 2006, gave apologies for making improper gestures at the public after being replaced after conceding his side's fourth goal in a defeat to Nacional Asunción, showing his middle finger to the preference section at the Estadio Defensores del Chaco.

"They are things that occur. I reacted in that moment because I was angry and what I did was a matter of in the moment, because I don't have a past with actions of this type. Also, I don't know to who I showed it to, and the only thing that I can say is ask for apologies to the people who felt offended by my actions."' – Antony Silva apologizing about his reaction to the crowd in a game against Nacional Asunción

Tacuary
After an impressive season with the club, Harry Redknapp brought Antony Silva on trial at Portsmouth. Silva could not agree to terms, and decided to sign for Club Tacuary of Paraguay.

Loan to Talleres de Córdoba
After an impressive season with Club Tacuary in which he played in the Copa Libertadores, Silva left Paraguay and was signed by Argentine side Talleres de Córdoba. Silva only played 7 games for Talleres in 2008.

Marília
In 2009 moved to Brazil to play for Marília Atlético Clube.

Rubio Ñu
After a brief spell in Brazil, Silva returned to Paraguay and signed for Club Rubio Ňú and quickly established himself as the main goalkeeper. On 29 January 2010 Silva was suspended by the Paraguayan Football Federation for doping, which Silva denied. Following the suspension it was reported that New York Red Bulls was interested in Silva.

Deportes Tolima
Silva signed in June 2010 with Deportes Tolima of Colombia, with which Silva played 140 matches.

3 de Febrero
In February 2014, Silva was officially presented as new goalkeeper for Ciudad del Este club 3 de Febrero for the Primera División season, returning to play in Paraguay after four years. Silva still had a contract wth his club in Colombia until 30 June 2014, but some administration differences forced his exit. Since the beginnings of 2014, Odair dos Santos from 3 de Febrero intended to count with Silva at the club.

Independiente Medellín
On 28 December 2014, El Colombiano confirmed Antony Silva's signing as new goalkeeper of Independiente de Medellin for the 2015 campaign. Silva was the club's second new signing following the acquisition of attacker Juan Fernando Caicedo.

Cerro Porteño
He signed with Cerro Porteño as a reinforcement for the 2016 Copa Libertadores.

International career

Silva has represented Paraguay at various youth levels. In 2001 Silva participated for Paraguay in the Under-17 World Cup and in 2003 participated in the Under-20 World Cup helping his nation reach the knock out stages. He played 3 matches in the 2003 Pan American Games. He was part of the squad that played in the 2015 Copa América, where he played 2 matches. He also was selected for the squad that competed in the Copa América Centenario.

In the 2021 Copa América, Paraguay's press hailed Silva as the figure for his saves during a quarter-final penalty shootout against Peru, which Paraguay ultimately lost. Silva saved penalties from Santiago Ormeño and Christian Cueva before Paraguay lost 4–3 in the shoot-out.

Career statistics

Club
This table is incomplete, thus some stats and totals could be incorrect.

2021 actual club Puebla FC Mexico

International

International appearances

Under-17

Under-20

Under-23

Senior

Honours
Club Libertad
Primera División (2): 2003, 2006

Deportes Tolima
Categoría Primera A
Runner-up (1): 2010 Finalización

Independiente Medellín
Categoría Primera A
Runner-up (1): 2015 Apertura

References

External links
 Antony Silva at playmakerstats.com (English version of ceroacero.es)
 
 
 

1984 births
Living people
Sportspeople from Asunción
Paraguayan people of Italian descent
Paraguayan footballers
Paraguayan expatriate footballers
Paraguay international footballers
Paraguay under-20 international footballers
Club Libertad footballers
General Caballero Sport Club footballers
Club Tacuary footballers
Club Rubio Ñu footballers
Club Atlético 3 de Febrero players
Cerro Porteño players
Marília Atlético Clube players
Deportes Tolima footballers
Talleres de Córdoba footballers
2 de Mayo footballers
Independiente Medellín footballers
Paraguayan Primera División players
Categoría Primera A players
Primera Nacional players
Expatriate footballers in Brazil
Expatriate footballers in Colombia
Expatriate footballers in Argentina
Association football goalkeepers
2015 Copa América players
Copa América Centenario players
2019 Copa América players